Johana Viveros Mondragón (born 3 April 1994) is a Colombian inline speedskater who has won multiple medals at the Central American and Caribbean Games, Inline Speed Skating World Championships, Pan American Games and World Games.

Career
Viveros started skating at the age of 10 in the Alfonso Barberena neighborhood park in Cali. She then went on to the Luz Mery Tristán Skating Club where she received a scholarship to continue training. She qualified for the 2015 Pan American Games in Toronto, Canada, but she fractured her elbow. At the 2018 Inline Speed Skating World Championships, she won three gold, two silver and one bronze medals, being the most awarded athlete of the competition and crowned champion along with the national team. At the 2018 Central American and Caribbean Games held in Barranquilla in 2018, she also managed to win three gold medals.

She represented Colombia at the 2022 World Games held in Birmingham, United States. She won medals in both road and track speed skating.

References

1994 births
Living people
Sportspeople from Cali
Colombian female speed skaters
Inline speed skaters
Competitors at the 2018 Central American and Caribbean Games
Roller speed skaters at the 2019 Pan American Games
Pan American Games gold medalists for Colombia
Pan American Games medalists in roller skating
Medalists at the 2019 Pan American Games
Competitors at the 2017 World Games
Competitors at the 2022 World Games
World Games gold medalists
World Games silver medalists
21st-century Colombian women